Being Mary Jane  is an American drama television series, created by Mara Brock Akil and starring Gabrielle Union, that debuted January 7, 2014, on BET. The series follows the professional and personal life of successful TV news anchor Mary Jane Paul (Union), who lives in Atlanta, Georgia.

On January 6, 2016, the series was renewed for a fourth season, which premiered on January 10, 2017.  On April 23, 2019, the series finale (Season 5) aired as a two-hour original movie special.

Series overview

Episodes

Season 1 (2013–14)

Season 2 (2015)

Season 3 (2015)

Season 4 (2017)

Season 5 (2019)

References

External links
 List of Being Mary Jane episodes at BET
 

Lists of American drama television series episodes
Split television seasons